James Thomson (1788–1850) was a British engraver, known for his portraits. He completed his apprenticeship in engraving and then  established himself independently, following the dot and stipple style. His engravings and paintings featured both leading figures of his day and those of previous periods.

Life
Thomson was baptised on 5 May 1788 at Mitford, Northumberland, where his father James Thomson, who later became vicar of Ormesby in Yorkshire, was then acting as curate. He was sent to London to be apprenticed to an engraver named Mackenzie. After completing an apprenticeship with Mackenzie, he worked for two years under Anthony Cardon, and then established himself independently. He became an accomplished engraver in the dot and stipple style. He died at his house in Albany Street, London, on 27 September 1850.

Works

Working mainly on portraits, Thomson was engaged for major illustrated works including Edmund Lodge's Portraits of Illustrious Personages, Fisher's National Portrait Gallery (of Henry Fisher, Son and Jackson, edited by William Jerdan), Horace Walpole's Anecdotes of Painting, Charles Heath's Book of Beauty, Anne Mee's Gallery of Beauties, the Keepsake, the Court Magazine, and Ancient Marbles in the British Museum.

Thomson's single plates included the portraits:

 Mrs. Storey, after Thomas Lawrence, 1826
 Lady Burghersh and her sisters, after Lawrence, 1827
 John Wesley, after John Jackson, 1828
 Charles James Blomfield, Bishop of London, after George Richmond, 1847
 Queen Victoria riding with Lord Melbourne, after Sir Francis Grant
 Prince Albert, after Sir William Charles Ross
 Louis-Philippe and his consort Maria Amalia of Naples and Sicily, a pair, after Édouard Louis Dubufe, 1850
 Elizabeth Pepys, wife of Samuel Pepys

Family
By his wife, Diana, whose maiden name was Lloyd, he had two daughters: Eliza and Ann. One daughter, Ann (or Anne), married the painter Frederick Goodall.

External Links
 Engraving of Henry Corbould's drawing of Richard Westmacott's sculpture of  published in the Friendship's Offering annual for 1826, with an illustration in verse by Letitia Elizabeth Landon.
 For paintings in Flowers of Loveliness, 1838:

References

Attribution

1788 births
1850 deaths
English engravers
People from Northumberland